Golejewo may refer to the following places:
Golejewo, Greater Poland Voivodeship (west-central Poland)
Golejewo, Kuyavian-Pomeranian Voivodeship (north-central Poland)
Golejewo, Masovian Voivodeship (east-central Poland)
Golejewo, Choszczno County in West Pomeranian Voivodeship (north-west Poland)
Golejewo, Myślibórz County in West Pomeranian Voivodeship (north-west Poland)